Cricket will be one of the 37 sports to be played at the 2022 Asian Games to be held in Hangzhou, China. Both men's and women's tournaments will be held in the event. Prior to this edition, cricket was last played at the Asian Games in 2014. The matches are to be played under Twenty20 International format since the International Cricket Council recognized all Twenty20 games to be played between its member countries after 1 January 2019 to have full T20I status. The Asian Games were originally planned to take place in September 2022, but were later postponed by one year because of the COVID-19 pandemic.

References

2022
2022 Asian Games events
Asian Games
2022 Asian Games